Glenn Loovens (born 22 September 1983) is a Dutch former professional footballer who played as a centre-back.

Club career

Early career
Loovens is the son of Hans Loovens, who played for FC Twente. He also has a brother called Ivo. He signed for the Feyenoord youth academy when he was twelve years old, where his teammates included Robin van Persie and Said Boutahar. In 2001, manager Bert van Marwijk promoted him to the first team.

Netherlands
Loovens came through the Feyenoord youth system and made his debut against PSV Eindhoven in the 2001–02 season in the Feyenoord team that later won the UEFA Cup, alongside Robin van Persie, Civard Sprockel and Ferne Snoyl. In the later seasons, he failed to make good on his promising start as he quickly lost his position in defence to Patrick Paauwe again. He made his European debut at 19 years old, in a 2–0 defeat to Dynamo Kyiv at the Olympic Stadium in Kyiv on 23 October 2002.

Cardiff City
Loovens spent the 2005–06 season on loan at Championship side Cardiff City and impressed enough so that they signed the promising young defender on a permanent deal after several months of negotiations for a reported fee of £250,000. He originally formed a defensive partnership with club captain Darren Purse but the 2007–08 season saw Purse lose his place in the side to Roger Johnson and the pair went on to form a vital base for the team to build on, including playing alongside each other in all six matches during the club's run to the 2008 FA Cup Final. Loovens found the back of the net in the final against Portsmouth but it was disallowed for an earlier infringement. The 2007–08 season also saw Loovens make his 100th appearance in all competitions for Cardiff by playing against Hull City on 12 March.

Celtic
Loovens was the subject of transfer interest for most of summer 2008, with Old Firm rivals Celtic and Rangers emerging as leading candidates to secure his signing. Walter Smith, manager of Rangers, declared his interest in Loovens and made an offer for his services but their valuation of the defender was rejected by Cardiff. On 16 August 2008, Loovens joined Scottish champions Celtic on a four-year contract for a fee of around £2.1 million Loovens stated that Parkhead was his preferred destination as he will get the chance to play in the Champions League. He made his Celtic debut on 23 August 2008, in a 3–0 win over Falkirk at Celtic Park. His first goal came on 23 September 2008 in a Co-op Insurance League Cup tie, also at Celtic Park, as Celtic beat Livingston 4–0.

Loovens scored the winning goal against Hearts in injury time on 20 September 2009, to send Celtic top of the table. He scored an own goal in a 1–3 defeat against Rangers in October 2010 and was criticised for his performance in Celtic's next game, a League Cup win over St Johnstone. Loovens paid for his poor form, as he was dropped for the following match, also against St Johnstone.

Sheffield Wednesday
Loovens signed a short-term deal in December 2013 for Sheffield Wednesday after impressing during a short training stint. He then decided to extend his contract with the club until May 2014.

Towards the end of that summer, on 13 July 2014, Loovens then extended for a further year after reportedly rejecting several contract offers from other clubs, both in England and abroad. He was also then promptly announced as club captain for the 2014–15 season by head coach Stuart Gray.

With one game to play in the 2017–18 season, it was announced that his contract wouldn't be renewed and he would be leaving at the end of the season.

Sunderland
In July 2018, Loovens signed a two-year contract with Sunderland. On 22 August 2019, it was announced Loovens would leave Sunderland after having only served a year of his two-year contract.

International career
Loovens received his first senior cap for the Netherlands when he started the Oranjes 3–0 friendly win over Japan, on 5 September 2009. He had previously been capped twice for the under-21 side. and he represented the Netherlands at the 2001 FIFA World Youth Championship.

Career statistics

HonoursFeyenoordUEFA Cup: 2001–02Cardiff CityFA Cup runner-up: 2007–08Celtic'
Scottish Premier League: 2011–12
Scottish Cup: 2010–11
Scottish League Cup: 2008–09

References

External links

Netherlands U21 stats at Ons Oranje

1983 births
Living people
People from Doetinchem
Footballers from Gelderland
Association football defenders
Dutch footballers
Dutch expatriate footballers
Dutch expatriate sportspeople in Spain
Dutch expatriate sportspeople in Wales
Netherlands international footballers
Netherlands under-21 international footballers
Netherlands youth international footballers
Eredivisie players
Eerste Divisie players
English Football League players
Scottish Premier League players
Feyenoord players
Excelsior Rotterdam players
De Graafschap players
Cardiff City F.C. players
Celtic F.C. players
Sheffield Wednesday F.C. players
Real Zaragoza players
Sunderland A.F.C. players
UEFA Cup winning players
Expatriate footballers in Wales
Expatriate footballers in Scotland
Expatriate footballers in Spain
Expatriate footballers in England
Dutch expatriate sportspeople in Scotland
Dutch expatriate sportspeople in England
FA Cup Final players